Lithonia High School is a public high school located in Stonecrest, Georgia, United States, near Lithonia. A part of the DeKalb County School District, it serves 1,450 students in grades 9–12.  Darrick McCray is the current principal. The school offers many clubs and extracurricular activities, including book club, Men of Distinction, Future Business Leaders of America, robotics, marching band, and chorus. Sports include baseball, football, basketball, volleyball, swimming, golf, tennis, soccer, track, gymnastics, cheerleading, softball, and wrestling.

The school was formerly in the Redan census-designated place.

As of the 2013–2014 school year, students at Lithonia High are required to wear school uniforms.

In 2014, 2015 and 2016, Lithonia was recognized for having a Gates Millennium Scholar.

Accreditation
On December 17, 2012, the Southern Association of Colleges and Schools announced that it had downgraded the DeKalb County Schools System's status from "on advisement" to "on probation," and warned the school system that the loss of their accreditation was "imminent."

However, DeKalb County named Lithonia as one of its top ten improved schools in 2012.

Notable alumni
 Matt Battaglia - former All-American football player, NFL player, actor, Emmy-winning producer
 Alton Brown - Food Network personality
 Kelvin Cato - retired NBA basketball player
 Max Cleland - United States Senator, 1997–2003
 Mike Potts - former Major League Baseball player
 Jordan Smith - NFL defensive end for the Jacksonville Jaguars

References

External links
 Lithonia High School
 

Stonecrest, Georgia
DeKalb County School District high schools